BBC Sessions is an album of recordings by the rock group the Jimi Hendrix Experience, released on MCA Records on June 2, 1998. It contains all the surviving tracks from their various appearances on BBC radio programmes, such as Saturday Club and Top Gear, recorded in 1967.

At a BBC radio session, a practice still alive in British radio today, a band is required to record material in a studio quickly with limited overdubbing, largely limited to and relying upon their live sound. Many groups as part of this tradition choose to record some songs that are not part of their main repertoire. The album also includes the only two surviving Hendrix UK TV soundtracks (both BBC) Late Night Line Up ("Manic Depression" only survives) and the 1969 Lulu Show (complete).  BBC Sessions therefore offers its own unique example of the Experience sound, and a revealing glimpse of a song from their early repertoire Howlin' Wolf's "Killing Floor" and their only known studio recording of Bob Dylan's "Can You Please Crawl Out Your Window?"

Apart from the "live" in studio versions of well-known Experience songs, there are several unique studio recordings of songs, i.e. "Driving South" (three versions), which includes several guitar lines derived from Albert Collins' "Frosty" (1962) and "Thaw Out" (1965), "(I'm Your) Hoochie Coochie Man", "Catfish Blues", "Hound Dog", "Hear My Train A Comin'" (two versions) and a couple of novelty tracks: the amusing parody of a BBC Radio 1 jingle "Radio One", and a recording with a young Stevie Wonder on drums (a cover of Wonder's own "I Was Made to Love Her"). It also includes the sound track from the band's infamous appearance on Lulu's television show in 1969.

This collection has been re-released as part of the Hendrix Family's project to remaster Jimi's discography in 2010 by Experience Hendrix and Legacy Recordings. The re-release contains two digitally remastered sound discs with "Burning of the Midnight Lamp" bonus track from August 24, 1967, and a DVD videodisc of footage from recording sessions, and 22 pages of program notes.  Some of this material had previously been released by Rykodisc in 1988 on an album titled Radio One.

Track listing
Details taken from the original Experience Hendrix CD notes; other sources may show different information.

Personnel
 Jimi Hendrix – vocals, guitar
 Mitch Mitchell – drums, except "Jammin'" & "I Was Made to Love Her"
 Noel Redding – bass guitar, backing vocals
 Stevie Wonder – drums on "Jammin'" & "I Was Made to Love Her"
 Alexis Korner – slide guitar on "I'm Your Hoochie Cooche Man"

Peak chart positions
 US Billboard 200: No. 50
 UK Albums Chart: No. 42

References

BBC Radio recordings
Compilation albums published posthumously
Jimi Hendrix live albums
Jimi Hendrix compilation albums
1998 live albums
1998 compilation albums
MCA Records compilation albums
MCA Records live albums
Live albums published posthumously